Evolve or Be Extinct is the eighth studio album by English grime artist Wiley. The album was released on 19 January 2012 as a double-disc album. Two singles were released from the album, "Link Up" and "Boom Blast". The album entered the UK Albums Chart at number 97 on 22 January 2012, then climbed up to number 86 in the UK Charts in its second week. Upon discussing the album, Wiley said: "I came to a point in my life where I realized that [I had] to actually evolve and I was just trying to put myself to the test, and make a real album that I would make. I used to do things and not finish them. This time around I actually did concentration from the start. If something wasn't right, I went back and I said, 'Wiley, this isn’t right.' Not to say on the other [albums] I didn’t work hard, but it’s just that this time I actually did concentrate, and it’s probably the first time I ever have."

Critical reception

Upon release, Evolve Or Be Extinct has received fairly positive feedback from the public and critics. Ash Houghton of SB.TV rounded up his review with: "All in all, Evolve Or Be Extinct is another strong piece of work from one of the most prolific, multi-talented artists the UK has to offer. Wiley consistently provides a body of work which encompasses his input on all levels, from production to vocals; his name is strewn throughout the album’s credits which, in turn, ensures nothing but the purest sound grime has to offer." Noel Gardner of BBC gave a satisfying review, saying: "A haphazard, sometimes ridiculous, but often impressively inventive new set. In fact, this feels like an album by, for and about himself. Most lyrics unapologetically address the life of Wiley; two baffling skits, in which he quarrels with a taxi driver and customs officer respectively, seem to play up to his hothead reputation. Evolve or Be Extinct will appeal largely to people already well aware of it, and who are looking for a full-length to rival his 2004 debut Treddin' on Thin Ice. This should go some way to satisfying them." Riky Bains of RWD Magazine gave Evolve of Be Extinct a positive review stating: "Wiley is moving in a new direction and throwing new sounds and innovative ideas at a tough audience; just like Charles Darwin. His work wasn’t fully accepted or appreciated till a decade later. Is this album ahead of its time?"

Track listing

Charts

Release history

References 

Wiley (musician) albums
2012 albums
Ninja Tune albums
Big Dada albums